Chloé Pelle (born 14 November 1989 in Paris) is a French international rugby union and rugby sevens player who has played for RC Chilly-Mazarin as a wing since 2020 and for the France women's national rugby union team since 2011.

Biography 
Pelle was born in Paris. As a youth, she played basketball. At the age of 20, she enrolled at the Ecole Centrale de Lille. She then started playing rugby sevens at the school and joined the Lille Metropole Rugby Club Villeneuve. She graduated with a degree in engineering and mathematics.

She is a cybersecurity analyst at a large French bank.

Career 
Pelle played for Lille Métropole Rugby Club Villeneuvois from 2010 to 2018. In June 2018, she left Lille Métropole RCV to join Stade français, with whom she played for two years. She currently plays for RC Chilly-Mazarin.

She played her first international rugby union game as part of the French team on October 29, 2011 against Italy. In 2017, she was selected to play in the 2017 Women's Rugby World Cup in Ireland. She is also a member of the French women's rugby sevens team.

She won a bronze medal at the 2022 Rugby World Cup Sevens.

2020 Summer Olympics 
Pelle competed at the 2020 Tokyo Summer Olympics, where the team won a silver medal.

Awards 
 Ordre national du Mérite (September 8th 2021 decree)

References 

1989 births
Living people
French rugby union players
France international women's rugby sevens players
French rugby sevens players